Ali Waheed (also known as Balak) (Dhivehi ޢަލީ ވަޙީދު) was the Tourism Minister of Maldives, a Maldivian politician, former MP (Peoples' Majlis) and the Chairperson of Jumhoory Party. He was also the Chairman of New Radiant Sports Club.

Early life and education 

Born on 20 July 1984, Ali Waheed is the only son of Mohamed Waheed and Zuhura Abdulla. Although his parents are from the islands of Kulhudhuffushi and Thoddoo, Ali Waheed was born and raised in the capital city of Malé. He underwent primary and secondary education at Jamaaluddin School and Majeedhiyya School. Upon completion of secondary education at Center for Higher Secondary Education, Ali Waheed went abroad for his undergraduate studies.

He completed his undergraduate studies at Limkokwing University of Creative Technology, Malaysia and holds a bachelor's degree of Mass Communication from the University of Curtin, Australia.

Ali Waheed worked at the Presidents’ Office of Maldives for a short period of time before and after completing his undergraduate studies. During this time he was offered to work at the 2008 Presidential Elections. He quit his job at the Presidents office in order to pursue a career in politics, as the then Civil Service Act prohibited Civil servants from working at political campaigns and rallies.

Political work and Parliament 

Ali Waheed first entered into the Maldivian political arena as the Spokesperson of Dhivehi Rayyithunge Party (DRP), the political party of the then incumbent President Maumoon Abdul Gayoom. He worked during the first democratic elections held in the Maldives to represent and defend DRP and President Gayyooms policies and other agendas. With the defeat of the 2008 elections, Ali Waheed ran for the first Parliamentary elections to be held after the ratification of the new Constitution, as a member of Dhivehi Rayyithuge Party.

In the May 2009 election, he ran for the Constituency of Thoddu and succeeded against his main opponent at that time from the ruling Maldivian Democratic Party.

After his election to Parliament, Ali Waheed also represented his party, the main opposition at the leadership level, being elected the first Deputy Leader during the 2010 DRP Congress. His close affiliation with the new DRP leader, Ahmed Thasmeen Ali was highly criticized by those loyal to the former President and the public as well. With the internal political disputes in DRP, Ali Waheed quit the party and joined the ruling party MDP in May 2011 with controversial criticism and allegations from both his former party and the general public.

Ali Waheed remains a politician of the Maldivian Democratic Party by serving two terms as the Deputy Parliamentary Group Leader and being elected in 2014, as the party's Chairperson

Chairman of New Radiant Sports Club 

In addition to politics, Ali Waheed took an active involvement in sports, particularly football. He became Chairman of New Radiant Sports Club in 2011 for a four-year term. Founded in 1979, the Club is one of the oldest clubs in the history of Maldives. New Radiant has since his Chairmanship repeated its success after a few unsuccessful years and qualified for the 2013 AFC quarter-finals.
Prior to being elected Chairman of New Radiant Sports Club, Ali Waheed served as the club manager for a brief period in 2008 and was appointed as the Maldivian National Football team Manager in the year 2011

Minister of Tourism 

Ali Waheed was appointed as the Tourism Minister of Maldives on 17 November 2018. The President asked for the resignation of Minister of Tourism on 8 July 2020 on allegations of sexual assault to Tourism Ministry Staff. Economic Minister Fayyaz took over the Ministry of Tourism on 9 July 2020.

References 

Living people
1984 births
Maldivian Democratic Party politicians